John Hooper Harvey  (25 May 1911 – 18 November 1997) was an English architectural historian, who specialised in writing on English Gothic architecture and architects. Paul Crossley has described him as "the most prolific and arguably the most influential writer on Gothic architecture in the post-war years". He made extensive use of archival sources, and is particularly remembered for having – through his study of Henry Yevele (1944), and his biographical dictionary of English Mediaeval Architects (1954) – helped dispel the myth that the architects of medieval buildings were anonymous figures of whom little could be discovered. He also published more generally on England in the later middle ages, and was a pioneer in the field of garden history.

Early life
Harvey was born in London, the only child of William Harvey (1883–1962), architect, and his wife, Alice née Wilcox (1874–1958). He was educated at St John's School, Leatherhead, after which, in 1928, he joined the architectural practice of Sir Herbert Baker. While in Baker's office he studied architecture at the Regent Street Polytechnic. From 1933 to 1935 he travelled with his father in Palestine, helping survey ancient buildings. In 1936 he took a job with the Office of Works.

Politics and World War II
In 1930 Harvey joined the far-right and antisemitic Imperial Fascist League (IFL), and for a while was active in the associated Nordic League. He had to curtail his activities when he joined the Office of Works, but he continued to be peripherally involved and to pay his subscriptions to the IFL until 1940. On the outbreak of World War II he was placed on a "Suspect List" by MI5. In 1942 his application, as a conscientious objector, for exemption from military service having been denied, he refused to submit to a medical examination, as a necessary preliminary to call-up, and was sentenced to 12 months' imprisonment. The sentence qualified him to make a fresh application to the Appellate Tribunal for Conscientious Objectors, who now placed him on the Register of Conscientious Objectors, and recommended to the Home Secretary his immediate release from prison, which recommendation was put into effect.

He was not re-employed by the Office of Works, and instead joined his father in identifying buildings of historic interest in danger of destruction from enemy action.

Post-war career
In 1947 Harvey was appointed consultant architect (for conservation matters) to Winchester College, a post he retained until 1964. In 1950 he became lecturer in conservation at the Bartlett School of Architecture at University College London, where he remained until 1959. These were part-time posts, allowing him to devote much of his time to writing.

He had begun to publish articles on medieval architecture in 1936, and his prodigious stream of publications, including numerous books, continued in the post-war years. His magisterial biographical dictionary of English Mediaeval Architects, the first edition of which appeared in 1954, contained 1,300 entries, and has been described as "a feat of titanic proportions". A central theme of many of his publications was the artistic importance of England and of the English national style in the fourteenth and fifteenth centuries. More particularly, he regarded perpendicular architecture as "the quintessential national style", and a manifestation of the English national character. Paul Crossley considers that "his Neo-Romantic sensibilities propelled him beyond romanticism into real historical understanding, inspired by a tenacious curiosity for fact, and based on a phenomenal learning". Elsewhere, Crossley compares Harvey's Gothic World (1950) with Nikolaus Pevsner's Outline of European Architecture (1942) and finds that the contrast "could not have been more telling: Harvey patiently accumulating masses of detailed research to fill his survey with lists of empirical data, Pevsner subsuming detail into the broad sweep of a pan-European synthesis". Photographs attributed to John Harvey are held in the Conway Library at The Courtauld Institute of Art whose archive, of primarily architectural images, is being digitised under the wider Courtauld Connects project.

In 1963 Harvey moved to York, where he was employed until 1970 as an investigator and editor (again on a part-time basis) by the Royal Commission on the Historical Monuments of England. In 1975 he moved to Frome, Somerset. It was from this time that he became increasingly interested in garden history, and a prominent figure in the Garden History Society.

Prejudices
Harvey's conviction of the importance and uniqueness of the English Gothic style meant that in much of his writing, in Crossley's view, "his nationalism continued to distort his judgement". Thus, in his well-received study of The Perpendicular Style (1978), he refused to acknowledge the influence of the French Rayonnant style on English perpendicular architecture, and he excluded Tudor perpendicular buildings from consideration on the grounds that the "distinctive nationalism" of the English style had been compromised in this period by the inclusion of minor motifs of exotic and foreign origin.

He successfully distanced himself in the post-war period from his earlier political affiliations, but a short passage in his successful and frequently reprinted book The Plantagenets (originally published 1948), in which he gave credence to stories of Jewish ritual murder, and praised the "statesmanship" of Edward I in expelling the Jews from England in 1290, continued to cause offence. He refused to amend the passage, and the publishers (Fontana) eventually allowed the book to go out of print in the mid-1980s.

Institutional affiliations and awards
Harvey was elected a fellow of the Society of Genealogists in 1939, the Royal Society of Literature in 1945, and the Society of Antiquaries of London in 1949. He served on the Council of the Ancient Monuments Society for some 30 years from 1960; and as President of the Garden History Society from 1982 to 1985. The University of York awarded him an honorary doctorate in 1976.

For his 70th birthday in 1981, rather than presenting him with the customary scholarly Festschrift, Harvey's friends and admirers helped fund the second edition of his English Mediaeval Architects (published 1984; further revised 1987).

Personal life
Harvey married (Sarah) Cordelia Story (1903–1996) in 1934. They had two sons, Richard (b. 1938) and Charles (1940–2000); and one daughter, Eleanour (b. 1945).

Principal publications
The Heritage of Britain (1941; second edition 1943)
Henry Yevele: The Life of an English Architect (1944; second edition 1946)
Gothic England: A Survey of National Culture, 1300–1550 (1947)
The Plantagenets: 1154–1485 (1948) 
Tudor Architecture (1949)
The Gothic World (1950)
The English Cathedrals (1950)
English Cathedrals: A Reader's Guide
English Mediaeval Architects: A Biographical Dictionary Down to 1550, with contributions by Arthur Oswald (1954; revised editions 1984 and 1987)
Itineraries [of] William Worcestre (editor and translator) (1969)
The Master Builders: Architecture in the Middle Ages (1971)
The Mediaeval Architect (1972)
Conservation of Buildings (1972)
Early Gardening Catalogues (1972)
Cathedrals of England and Wales (1974)
Sources for the History of Houses (1974) 
Early Nurserymen (1974) 
Mediaeval Craftsmen (1975)
The Black Prince and his Age (1976)
The Perpendicular Style, 1330–1485 (1978)
Mediaeval Gardens (1981)
The Availability of Hardy Plants of the Late Eighteenth Century (1988)

Fuller lists of Harvey's many publications appear in:

References

Bibliography

External links

1911 births
1997 deaths
20th-century English historians
English architectural historians
English architecture writers
British medievalists
People educated at St John's School, Leatherhead
Alumni of the University of Westminster
Fellows of the Society of Antiquaries of London
Fellows of the Royal Society of Literature
Academics of University College London
English fascists
Writers from London
English conscientious objectors
English male non-fiction writers
People of the Royal Commission on the Historical Monuments of England
20th-century English male writers